Ethaliella is a genus of sea snails, marine gastropod mollusks in the family Trochidae, the top snails.

Description
This genus is characterized by a depressed, openly umbilicated, smoothish shell. The peristome  is obtuse. The columellar margin is dilated,  partly  vaulting over the umbilicus, which is radially sulcate within and has a very low, wide and rounded marginal cord.

This genus comprises species related to Monilea, Ethalia  and Isanda, but with features of the columellar lip and umbilicus unlike either. Minolia and its boreal ally Solariella  differ by the almost or quite unexpanded columellar margin.

Distribution
This marine genus occurs off Japan, the Philippines and in the East China Sea.

Species
Species within the genus Ethaliella include:
 Ethaliella capillata (Gould, 1862)
 Ethaliella floccata (Sowerby III, 1903)
 Ethaliella pulchella (A. Adams, 1855)
 Ethaliella rhodomphala (E.A. Smith, 1903)

References

External links
 To GenBank 
 To World Register of Marine Species

 
Trochidae
Gastropod genera